The Pennsylvania Office of Open Records is a governmental agency in Pennsylvania that administers the Pennsylvania Right to Know Law.

Decisions made by the Office of Open Records regarding appeals, called "final determinations," are available online.

External links

References

State agencies of Pennsylvania
Freedom of information in the United States